"The Trouble with Women" is the twenty-third episode of the 1969 ITC British television series Randall and Hopkirk (Deceased) starring Mike Pratt, Kenneth Cope and Annette Andre. The episode was first broadcast on 28 February 1970 on ITV. It was directed by Cyril Frankel.

Synopsis
Jeff is hired by Susan Lang to log her husband's movements. It transpires that she is not all that she appears, and that Jeff is entering a very dangerous situation.

Overview
With Jeff in danger, Marty attempts to speak with a psychic medium so as to get the police to him. In so doing, he finds a group of ghosts, all in different white clothing, who are waiting in line to deliver their messages.

Cast
Mike Pratt .... Jeff Randall
Kenneth Cope .... Marty Hopkirk
Annette Andre .... Jeannie Hopkirk
Neal Arden ....  2nd Poker Player
Edward Brayshaw ....  Paul Lang
Denise Buckley ....  Susan Lang
Arnold Diamond ....  1st Poker Player
Howard Goorney ....  1st Ghost
Keith Grenville ....  P.C. Russell
Harry Hutchinson ....  2nd Ghost
Paul Maxwell ....  Alan Corder
Gwen Nelson ....  Mrs. Halloway
Robert Russell ....  Harry
Frederick Treves ....  Inspector
Nik Zaran ....  Brin

Production
Although the 23rd episode in the series, The Trouble with Women was the ninth episode to be shot, filmed between September and November 1968.

References

External links

Episode overview at Randallandhopkirk.org.uk
Filming locations at Randallandhopkirk.org.uk

Randall and Hopkirk (Deceased) episodes
1970 British television episodes